The Lwów Ghetto was a Nazi ghetto in the city of Lwów (now Lviv, Ukraine) in the territory of Nazi-administered General Government in German-occupied Poland.

The ghetto, set up in the second half of 1941, was liquidated in June 1943; all its inhabitants who survived prior killings were deported to the Bełżec extermination camp and the Janowska concentration camp.

Background
Lviv (Polish: Lwów) was a multicultural city just before World War II, with a population of 312,231. The city's 157,490 ethnic Poles constituted just over 50 percent of the population, with Jews at 32 percent (99,595) and Ukrainians at 16 percent (49,747). On 28 September 1939, after the joint Soviet-German invasion, the USSR and Germany signed the German–Soviet Frontier Treaty, which assigned about 200,000 km2 (77,000 sq mi) of Polish territory inhabited by 13.5 million people of all nationalities to the Soviet Union. Lviv was then annexed to the Soviet Union. At the time of the German attack on the Soviet Union on 22 June 1941, about 160,000 Jews lived in the city; the number had swelled by tens of thousands due to the arrival of Jewish refugees from German-occupied Poland in late 1939. All along the German-Soviet front, the Soviet secret police (the NKVD) engaged in mass murder of prisoners, in what later became known as the NKVD prisoner massacres. According to estimates by contemporary historians, the number of victims in Western Ukraine was probably between 10,000 and 40,000, with at least two-thirds of them ethnic Ukrainians.

German invasion and pogroms

Lviv was occupied by the German Wehrmacht in the early hours of 30 June 1941. That day, Jews were press-ganged by the Germans to remove bodies of the NKVD's victims from the three local jails. During the morning of 30 June, an ad hoc Ukrainian People's Militia was formed in the city. It included OUN activists who had moved in from Krakow with the Germans, OUN members who lived in Lviv, and former Soviet policemen—who had either decided to switch sides or who were OUN members that had infiltrated the Soviet police. A full-blown pogrom began on the next day, 1 July. Jews were taken from their apartments, made to clean streets on their hands and knees, or perform rituals that identified them with Communism. Jews continued to be brought to the three prisons, first to exhume the bodies and then to be killed. Sub-units of Einsatzgruppe C arrived on 2 July, at which point violence escalated further. The SS death squad conducted a series of mass-murder operations which continued for the next few days.

A second pogrom took place in the last days of July 1941 and was named the "Petlura Days" after the assassinated Ukrainian leader and pogromist Symon Petliura. This pogrom was organized by the Nazis, but carried out by the Ukrainians, as a prologue to the total annihilation of the Jewish population of Lwów. Somewhere in the neighborhood of between 5,000–7,000 Jews were brutally beaten and more than 2,000 murdered in this massacre. In addition, some 3,000 persons, mostly Jews, were executed in the municipal stadium by the German military.

The ghetto
Following the Nazi takeover, SS-Brigadeführer Fritz Katzmann became the SS and Police Leader (SSPF) of Lwów. On his orders the ghetto called Jüdischer Wohnbezirk was established on 8 November 1941 in the northern part of the city. Some 80,000 Jews were ordered to move there by 15 December 1941 and all Poles and Ukrainians to move out. Zamarstynów (now Zamarstyniv) neighborhood was designated to form the Jewish quarter. Before the beginning of World War II it was one of the poorest suburbs of Lwów. German police also began a series of "selections" in an operation called "Action under the bridge" - 5,000 elderly and sick Jews were shot as they crossed under the rail bridge on Pełtewna Street (called bridge of death by the Jews) moving slowly toward the gate. Eventually, between 110,000 and 120,000 Jews were forced into the new ghetto. The living conditions there were extremely poor, coupled with severe overcrowding. For example, food rations allocated to the Jews were estimated to equal only 10% of the German and 50% of the Ukrainian or Polish rations.

The Germans established a Jewish police force called the Jüdischer Ordnungsdienst Lemberg wearing dark blue Polish police uniforms from before World War II, but with the Polish insignia replaced by a Magen David and the new letters J.O.L. in various positions on their uniform. They were given rubber truncheons. Their ranks numbered from 500 to 750 policemen. The Jewish police force answered to the Jewish National city council known as the Judenrat, which in turn answered to the Gestapo.

Deportations

The Lemberg Ghetto was one of the first to have Jews transported to the death camps as part of Aktion Reinhard. Between 16 March and 1 April 1942, approximately 15,000 Jews were taken to the Kleparów railway station and deported to the Belzec extermination camp. Following these initial deportations, and death by disease and random shootings, around 86,000 Jews officially remained in the ghetto, though there were many more not recorded. During this period, many Jews were also forced to work for the Wehrmacht and the ghetto's German administration, especially in the nearby Janowska labor camp. On 24–25 June 1942, 2,000 Jews were taken to the labor camp; only 120 were used for forced labor, and all of the others were shot.

Between 10 and 31 August 1942, the "Great Aktion" was carried out, where between 40,000 and 50,000 Jews were rounded up, gathered at transit point placed in Janowska camp and then deported to Belzec. Many who were not deported, including local orphans and hospital inpatients, were shot. On 1 September 1942 the Gestapo hanged the head of Lwów’s Judenrat and members of the ghetto's Jewish police force on balconies of Judenrat's building at Łokietka street and Hermana street corner. Around 65,000 Jews remained while winter approached with no heating or sanitation, leading to an outbreak of typhus.

Between 5 and 7 January 1943, another 15,000-20,000 Jews, including the last members of the Judenrat, were shot outside of the town on the orders of Fritz Katzmann. After this aktion in January 1943 Judenrat was dissolved, that what remained of the ghetto was renamed Judenlager Lemberg (Jewish Camp Lwów), thus formally redesigned as labor camp with about 12,000 legal Jews, able to work in the German war industry and several thousands illegal Jews (mainly women, children and elderly) hiding in it.

At the beginning of June 1943 Germans decided to end the existence of the Jewish quarter and its inhabitants. As Nazis entered the ghetto they met some sporadic acts of armed resistance, facing grenades and Molotov cocktails. The Germans and their Ukrainian collaborators lost 9 killed and 20 wounded. However, most of the Jews were trying to hide themselves in earlier prepared hideouts (so called bunkers). In effect many buildings were suffused with gasoline and burned in order to "flush out" Jews from their hiding places. Some Jews managed to escape or to conceal themselves in the sewer system.

By the time that the Soviet  Red Army entered Lwów on 26 July 1944, only a few hundred Jews remained in the city. The number varies from 200 to 900 (823 according to data of Jewish Provisional Committee in Lwów,  from 1945).

Among its notable inhabitants was Chaim Widawski, who disseminated news about the war picked up with an illegal radio. Polish Olympic football player Leon Sperling was shot to death by the Nazis in the ghetto in December 1941.  Nazi-hunter Simon Wiesenthal was one of the best-known Jewish inhabitants of Lemberg Ghetto to survive the war (as his memoirs The Executioners Among Us indicate, he was saved from execution by a Ukrainian policeman), though he was later transported to a concentration camp, rather than remaining in the ghetto.

Some local gentiles attempted to aid and shelter the Jews. Kazimiera Nazarewicz, a Polish nanny hired by a Jewish family, sheltered their daughter throughout the war, and delivered aid to her parents who were imprisoned in the ghetto. After the war, Nazarewicz became one of the recipients of the Righteous Among the Nations title. Leopold Socha and Stefan Wróblewski, laborers maintaining the municipal sewage system, organized in their shelters for 21 one Jews who survived the ghetto's liquidation; 10 of them survived the war. Socha, Wróblewski and their wives received the Righteous titles after the war. Another Righteous, Miroslav Kravchuk, with the help of some acquaintances, shelter his Jewish ex-wife, and some of their other family members and acquaintances. Kravchuk survived 6-month imprisonment by Gestapo following their arrest of him under the suspicion of him helping Jews.

See also
In Darkness 2011 historical drama by David F. Shamoon and Agnieszka Holland
Jewish ghettos in German-occupied Poland
The Holocaust in Poland
World War II casualties of Poland

Notes

References

A True Story of Holocaust Survivors. The documentary includes 60 historical pictures. 1932-1944, Lwow, Poland (now Lviv, Ukraine)
Aharon Weiss, Encyclopaedia of the Holocaust vol. 3, pp. 928–931. Map, photos
Filip Friedman, Zagłada Żydów lwowskich (Extermination of the Jews of Lwów) - online in Polish, Ukrainian and Russian

Further reading
 Marek Herman, From the Alps to the Red Sea. Tel Aviv: Hakibbutz Hameuchad Publishers and Beit Lohamei Haghetaot, 1985. pp. 14–60
 Dawid Kahane, Lvov Ghetto Diary. Amherst: University of Massachusetts Press, 1990.  (Published in Hebrew as Yoman getto Lvov, Jerusalem:Yad Vashem, 1978)
 Dr Filip Friedman, Zagłada Żydów lwowskich, Centralna Żydowska Komisja Historyczna, Centralny Komitet Żydów Polskich, Nr 4, Łódź 1945

 Weiss, Jakob, The Lemberg Mosaic. New York : Alderbrook Press, 2010. 
 Chiger, Krystyna, The Girl in the Green sweater: A life in Holocaust's Shadow, Macmillan, 2010.  
 Leon Weliczker Wells, The Janowska Road (original publication Macmillan, 1963). Amazon: Halo Pr, 1999.

External links
 US Holocaust Museum information on Lviv
 Database of names from the Lviv Ghetto
 

 
History of Lviv
Jewish ghettos in Nazi-occupied Poland
1941 establishments in Ukraine
1943 disestablishments in Ukraine